The 3rd Eye is a 2017 Indonesian horror film directed by Rocky Soraya and written by Riheam Junianti and Rocky Soraya. The plot revolves around the young Abel (Bianca Hello) who is seeing mysterious things around her family’s home. It was followed by a sequel in 2019, made by the same director/writers.

Premise 
The 3rd Eye follows the young Abel (Bianca Hello) who is seeing mysterious things around her family’s home. She has a hard time convincing her parents and sister about the sightings though, as they can't see any of the mentioned events themselves. 12 years later, Abel's parents die in a traffic accident and the sisters move back to their old house. In a search for understanding of Abels's ongoing mysterious sightings, the sisters soon learn about “the third eye”, a way to see the supernatural world.

Plot 
The movie opens with Alia telling her younger 5-year-old sister Abel, that the ghosts she sees and hears are figments of her imagination, but one night a grotesque figure attacks Abel leaving her legs scarred.
 
10 years later, Alia is a hard-working professional and Abel is an edgy 15 year old teenager who still sees the ghosts of her childhood. When the sisters' parents die in a car accident, they are forced to leave their current home and return to their parents' old estate where Abel had been attacked years earlier. Alia has been dating a photographer named Davin for 8 months now who joins them at the estate. Abel's hallucinations worsen and she tells Alia that the ghost family that occupies the estate doesn't want them to live there. Alia, now excessively worried about Abel's mental health, decides to take her to a psychiatrist. Abel reveals that her mother had taken her to Bu Windu, a spiritual practitioner, and not a psychologist, when she was a kid. They go to Bu Windu who tells Alia about Abel's open third eye. Alia, who doesn't believe in the paranormal, mockingly asks Mrs. Windu to open her third eye. When her third eye is opened she starts witnessing a string of supernatural beings which makes her finally believe Abel's warnings. It becomes apparent that a family of 3 ghosts occupy Alia and Abel's estate, and want to avenge their deaths. Alia is initially possessed by the 3 ghosts who use her to kill their murderer, the family gardener. They then take Abel with them to the netherworld. Mrs. Windu tells Alia that to rescue Abel she has to go to the netherworld with a spirit so that their energies will blend and she will appear as a ghost to them. Only then it is revealed that Davin was really a spirit all along. He had died in a car accident the same day he had started dating Alia. Alia and Davin save Abel after which he goes to heaven.

Even though everything seems alright, a ghost named Mirah keeps following Alia and Abel to wherever they go.

Cast 
 Jessica Mila as Alia, Abel's elder sister and Davin's girlfriend
 Denny Sumargo as Davin, Alia's boyfriend
 Citra Prima as Mrs. Windu, Abel's spiritual advisor
 Bianca Hello as Abel, Alia's younger sister
 Epy Kusnandar as Mr. Asep, Alia's housekeeper
 Anita Hara as Alia's mother
 Derry Drajat as Uncle Herman, Alia's father's friend
 Voke Victoria as Teenage Alia
 Shofia Shireen as Young Abel
 Afdhal Yusman as Alia's father
 Asri Handayani as Mrs. Sumarno, ghost at Alia's house
 Agus Julian as Mr. Sumarno, ghost at Alia's house
 Ladislao as foreigner who likes Alia at cafe
 Daniel Leo as Davin's father
 Dea Rizkyana as Tasya, ghost at hospital

Release
It was released on November 30, 2017 in Indonesia cinemas. One year later, it was released on Netflix streaming.

References

External links 
 
 

2017 films
2017 horror films
2017 horror thriller films
2010s Indonesian-language films
Indonesian horror thriller films
Indonesian-language Netflix original films